Kilcummin is a rural locality in the Isaac Region, Queensland, Australia. At the  Kilcummin had a population of 228 people.

Geography 
The Gregory Developmental Road passes through the locality from the south to the south-west.

The Blair Athol branch line of the Central Western Railway passes through the locality from east to south-west with Blackridge railway station in the south-east of the locality.

History 
Kilcummin State School opened on 2 February 1959.

In the  Kilcummin had a population of 260 people.

Education 
Kilcummin State School is a government primary (Prep-6) school for boys and girls at 190 East West Road. In 2016, the school had an enrolment of 30 students with 4 teachers (2 full-time equivalent) with 6 non-teaching staff (3 full-time equivalent). In 2018, the school had an enrolment of 33 students with 3 teachers (2 full-time equivalent) and 7 non-teaching staff (3 full-time equivalent).

References

Further reading

External links 
 — contains a description of Kilcummin in 1899

Isaac Region
Localities in Queensland